Greek Orthodox Church of St. George may refer to:
Greek Orthodox Church of St. George (Des Moines, Iowa)
Greek Orthodox Church of St. George (Piscataway, New Jersey)